Alfred Dohring (11 July 1896 – 13 July 1982) was an Australian politician. He was a Member of the Queensland Legislative Assembly.

Early life
Alfred Dohring was born on 11 July 1896 in Alpha, Queensland, the son of August Dohring and his wife Jane (née Donnell).

Politics
Dohring was the member for Roma in the Legislative Assembly of Queensland from 1953 to 1957, representing first the Labor Party and then the breakaway Queensland Labor Party in 1957.

Fall from Story Bridge
On Thursday 29 July 1954, Dohring fell 100 feet from the centre span of the Story Bridge to the Brisbane River below. An officer on the freighter Daylesford heard the splash and dispatched two seamen in a ship's boat who dragged the unconscious Dohring from the water. He suffered extensive injuries and was placed in an iron lung at the Brisbane General Hospital. When he recovered consciousness, he told police he must have blacked-out as he had no memory of the fall. Doctors said he was lucky to have survived such a fall. By late August, he was well enough to return to his parliamentary duties.

Later life
Dohring died in 1982 and was buried in Mt Gravatt Cemetery.

References

1896 births
1982 deaths
Queensland Labor Party members of the Parliament of Queensland
Members of the Queensland Legislative Assembly
Place of birth missing
Australian Labor Party members of the Parliament of Queensland
20th-century Australian politicians